The 39th Guangdong–Hong Kong Cup was held on 1 January and 4 January 2017. Guangdong won their 24th title after winning 4–3 on aggregate.

Squads

Guangdong
 Head Coach:  Chen Yuliang

Hong Kong
The final 20-man squad of Hong Kong was announced on 28 December 2016.
 Head Coach:  Liu Chun Fai

Match details

First leg

Second leg

Guangdong won 4–3 on aggregate.

References

2016–17 in Hong Kong football
2017
2017 in Chinese football